Okanj (Serbian Окањ) is a saline oxbow lake situated near the village of Elemir in the Zrenjanin commune, western Banat, Vojvodina Province, Serbia.

The whole depression occupies 200 hectares and contains brackish water. In some parts the edges are surrounded by reeds, and there are also extreme saline edges, with short halophylous vegetation.

Fauna
Herons traditionally breed here and a mixed colony with spoonbills was formed in 1998. In that year there were 47 pairs of great egret (Egretta alba), 33 pairs of grey heron (Ardea cinerea), 27 pairs of purple heron (Ardea purpurea) and 60 pairs of Eurasian spoonbill (Platalea leucorodia).

References

External links
 Picasa photo

Lakes of Serbia
Nature reserves in Serbia
Zrenjanin